PARASOL  (Polarization & Anisotropy of Reflectances for Atmospheric Sciences coupled with Observations from a Lidar) was a French-built Earth observing research satellite. It carried an instrument called POLDER which studied the radiative and microphysical properties of clouds and aerosols.

PARASOL was launched from the French spaceport in Kourou, French Guiana on December 18, 2004 by an Ariane 5 G+.

It flew in formation in the "A Train" constellation with several other satellites (Aqua, CALIPSO, CloudSat and Aura). These satellites had, for the first time ever, combined a full suite of instruments for observing clouds and aerosols, from passive radiometers to active lidar and radar sounders.

On 2 December 2009, PARASOL was manoeuvred out of the A-Train, dropping some 4 km below the other satellites by early January 2010.

The satellite's mission was formally ended exactly 9 years after launch on December 18, 2013.

External links
PARASOL site

References

Earth observation satellites of France
Spacecraft launched in 2004
Spacecraft launched by Ariane rockets